Charles Colton may refer to:

 Charles H. Colton (1848–1915), clergyman in New York State, Bishop of Buffalo
Charles Erastus Colton, American architect
 Charles Caleb Colton (1780–1831), English cleric, writer and collector
 Charles A. Colton, President of New Jersey Institute of Technology, 1881–1918